Domar is an upazila of Nilphamari District in the Division of Rangpur, Bangladesh.

Geography
It has 33490 households and total area 250.84 km2. Three rivers, namely Buri Tista, Shalki and Deonai are flowing through the upazila.

Demographics
As of the 1991 Bangladesh census, Domar has a population of 175507. Males constitute 51.16% of the population, and females 48.84%. This Upazila's eighteen up population is 87290. Domar has an average literacy rate of 39% (7+ years), and the national average of 32.4% literate.

Administration
Domar thana was formed in 1875 and it was turned into an upazila in 1984.

Domar Upazila is divided into Domar Municipality and ten union parishads: Bamunia, Bhogda Buri, Boragari, Domar, Gomnati, Harinchara, Jorabari, Ketkibari, Panga Motukpur, and Sonaray. The union parishads are subdivided into 47 mauzas and 47 villages.

Domar Municipality is subdivided into 9 wards and 12 mahallas.

Notable people
Shahrin Islam Tuhin, BNP politician

See also
Upazilas of Bangladesh
Districts of Bangladesh
Divisions of Bangladesh

References

Upazilas of Nilphamari District